Bara Bamonia is a census town in the Habra II CD block of Barasat Sadar subdivision in North 24 Parganas district in the state of West Bengal, India.

Geography

Location

Bara Bamonia, Guma and Khorddabamonia form a cluster of census towns.

Area overview
The area covered in the map alongside is largely a part of the north Bidyadhari Plain. located in the lower Ganges Delta. The country is flat. It is a little raised above flood level and the highest ground borders the river channels. 54.67% of the people of the densely populated area lives in the urban areas and 45.33% lives in the rural  areas.

Note: The map alongside presents some of the notable locations in the subdivision. All places marked in the map are linked in the larger full screen map.

Demographics
According to the 2011 Census of India, Bara Bamonia had a total population of 7,193, of which 3,683 (51%) were males and 3,510 (49%) were females. Population in the age range 0–6 years was 756. The total number of literate persons in Bara Bamonia was 5,745 (89.25% of the population over 6 years).

According to the 2011 Census of India, Habra Urban Agglomeration had a total population of 304,584, of which 154,863 (51%) were males and 149,723 (49%) were females. Population in the age range 0–6 years was 23,023. The total number of literate persons in Habra UA was 256,313 (91.03% of the population over 6 years). The constituents of Habra Urban Agglomeration were Habra (M), Ashoknagar Kalyangarh (M), Bara Bamonia (CT), Guma (CT), Anarbaria (CT) and Khorddabamonia (CT).

 India census, Bara Bamonia had a population of 6174. Males constitute 51% of the population and females 49%. Bara Bamonia has an average literacy rate of 73%, higher than the national average of 59.5%; with 55% of the literates being male and 45% being female. 13% of the population is under 6 years of age.

Infrastructure
As per District Census Handbook 2011, Bara Bamonia covered an area of 0.76 km2. It had 6 primary schools, 2 middle schools, 2 secondary schools and 1 senior secondary school, and the nearest degree college was 10 km away at Habra. The nearest hospital was 7 km away, the nearest dispensary/health centre was 1 km away, the nearest family welfare centre was 4 km away, the nearest maternity and child welfare centre was 7 km away and the nearest maternity home was 7 km away.

Transport
Bara Bamonia is on National Highway 112 (old numbering NH 35).

Guma railway station, located nearby at Guma, on the Sealdah-Bangaon branch line, is 37.3 km from Sealdah and is part of the Kolkata Suburban Railway system.

Healthcare
North 24 Parganas district has been identified as one of the areas where ground water is affected by arsenic contamination.

See also
  Map of Habra II CD Block on Page 313 of District Census Handbook.

References

Cities and towns in North 24 Parganas district